is a video game developed by Game Arts and published by Capcom and Working Designs in 2000, and by Swing! Deutschland in Europe in 2002 for PlayStation 2. The game was a launch title on the PlayStation 2 in North America.

Reception

The game received "average" reviews according to the review aggregation website Metacritic. Eric Bratcher of NextGen said, "If you can buy one mech game, [Armored Core 2] will give you more for your money. But if you can afford two, this title is well worth your time." In Japan, Famitsu gave it a score of 33 out of 40.

The game was a runner-up for "Action Game of 2000" Editors' Choice award at IGNs Best of 2000 Awards for PlayStation 2, which went to TimeSplitters.

Notes

References

External links
 

2000 video games
Capcom games
First-person shooters
Game Arts games
PlayStation 2 games
PlayStation 2-only games
Video games about mecha
Video games developed in Japan
Working Designs